SK Sparta Kolín is a Czech football club located in Kolín. It plays in the Bohemian Football League, the third tier of football in the country. The club played in the Czech 2. Liga in the 2001–02 season and 2014–15 season. The club won the Bohemian Football League in the 2013–14 season and their promotion to the Second League was confirmed in June 2014.

Historical names
 1912–1948: SK Sparta Kolín
 1951–1990: TJ Jiskra Kolín
 1996–2001: FK Mogul Kolín
 2001–2020: FK Kolín
 2020–: SK Sparta Kolín

Honours
Bohemian Football League (third tier)
 Champions 2000–01, 2013–14

References

External links
 

Football clubs in the Czech Republic
Association football clubs established in 1912
1912 establishments in Austria-Hungary
Sport in Kolín